KTMO-LP, UHF analog channel 36 (VHF digital channel 10.3), was a low-powered Telemundo-affiliated television station licensed to Amarillo, Texas, United States. Founded in 2002 by Drewry Communications, Telemundo Amarillo was the first Spanish-language television station in the Panhandle area.

The station's license was cancelled by the Federal Communications Commission on March 12, 2014; the signal was made redundant by KFDA's carriage of Telemundo on digital channel 10.3.

News operation
Two half-hour newscasts were produced from KFDA's facilities in Amarillo.

Newscasts

 Noticias Telemundo a las Cinco - 5–5:30 p.m.
 Noticias Telemundo a las Diez - 10–10:30 p.m.

News anchors

 Paola Albarran - weekdays at 5 p.m.
 Maury Román- weekdays at 10 p.m.

Weather
 Nuvia Martinez- weekdays at 5 and 10 p.m.

External links

TMO-LP
Spanish-language television stations in Texas
Defunct television stations in the United States
Television channels and stations disestablished in 2014 
2002 establishments in Texas
2014 disestablishments in Texas 
TMO-LP